Lensk Airport  is a public airport near Lensk in Russia. It works as focus city for Alrosa Mirny Air Enterprise.

Airlines and destinations

Accidents and incidents
On 4 July 2012, a helicopter operated by UTair Aviation for an oil and gas company crashed in a remote area about 4 kilometers from the runway of Lensk Airport. The wreckage was found several hours later and three bodies were recovered, with the fourth person also presumed killed. The cause was not immediately known, but UTair grounded all aircraft at Lensk Airport pending an investigation into the quality of fuel supply at the airport.

References

External links

Airports in the Sakha Republic